Attorney General Denman may refer to:

Thomas Denman, 1st Baron Denman (1779–1854), Attorney General for England and Wales
Ulysses G. Denman (1866–1961), Attorney General of Ohio